
Year 621 (DCXXI) was a common year starting on Thursday (link will display the full calendar) of the Julian calendar. The denomination 621 for this year has been used since the early medieval period, when the Anno Domini calendar era became the prevalent method in Europe for naming years.

Events 
 By place 
 Byzantine Empire 
 Emperor Heraclius concludes a peace agreement (in exchange for an annual tribute) with the Avars on the Balkan Peninsula, giving him a free hand to assemble Byzantine forces in Asia Minor, for non-military expenditure against the Persian Empire.
 The city of Málaga, in southern Spain in the province of Spania, is conquered by the Visigoths.

 Europe 
 King Sisebut dies after a 9-year reign and is succeeded by his son Reccared II (just a child). Reccared is placed on the throne by the Visigothic nobility, but dies after two months. Suintila, his half-uncle and regent, becomes  king of the Visigothic Kingdom.

 Asia 
 Emperor Gaozu delegates control of his military and civil administration in the east to his second son, Li Shimin. He concentrates on reforming coinage (→ Kaiyuan Tongbao) and taxation.
 May 28 – Battle of Hulao: Li Shimin defeats the numerically superior army of Dou Jiande near the Hulao Pass.
 June 4 – Wang Shichong, self-declared emperor, surrenders to Li Shimin at Luoyang following Dou Jiande's defeat. Gaozu spares his life, but he is later assassinated.

 By topic 

 Religion 
 According to tradition, Muhammad, Islamic prophet, is said to have visited heaven aboard the steed/unicorn with wings or Buraq, in the Isra wal-Miraj, (the Night Journey), from Mecca to Jerusalem and then to heaven from Jerusalem's Temple Mount, then back to Mecca.

 Technology 
 The Chinese establish an imperial bureau for the manufacture of porcelain. Their technology will advance further under the Tang Dynasty (approximate date).

Births 
 Ardashir III, king of the Persian Empire (d. 629)
 Gertrude of Nivelles, Frankish abbess (d. 659)
 Suraqah al-Bariqi, Arab poet (d. 698)

Deaths 
 November 15 – Malo, Welsh bishop 
 Dou Jiande, general of the Sui Dynasty (b. 573)
 Dou Kang, general of the Sui Dynasty
 Reccared II, king of the Visigoths
 Sisebut, king of the Visigoths
 Wang Shichong, general of the Sui Dynasty
 Xiao Xian, prince of the Liang Dynasty (b. 583)
 Zhu Can, rebel leader during the Sui Dynasty

References

Sources